The 1929–30 season was Real Sociedad's second season in La Liga.
This article shows player statistics and all matches that the club played during the 1929–30 season.

Squad

Squad stats

League

Final table

King Alfonso XIII's Cup

Round of 32

Round of 16

External links
Squad and results

Real Sociedad
Real Sociedad seasons